Robert Alan Clay (born 2 October 1946), known as Bob Clay, is a left-wing politician and former Labour MP in the United Kingdom.

Early life
Robert Clay was educated at Bedford School and Gonville and Caius College, Cambridge. Unusually for a man of his background, he went on to become a bus driver, working for Tyne and Wear PTE from 1975 to 1983. Clay first joined Labour as a teenager, but left to join the Trotskyist group International Socialists. He became a union shop steward in the 1980s and rejoined Labour.

Parliamentary career
Clay was first elected to Parliament in 1983 for the Sunderland North constituency, replacing Labour MP Frederick Willey. He was re-elected in 1987, but stood down at the 1992 general election; Labour's William Etherington was elected in his place.

Subsequent political activities
Clay opposed the 2003 Iraq War. He backed the left-wing party RESPECT The Unity Coalition in the 2004 European Elections. At the 2005 general election, he acted as agent for Reg Keys, who stood against the Prime Minister Tony Blair in Blair's Sedgefield constituency on an anti-war ticket. Keys' son Tom had been killed in action in Iraq. Although Clay was not an originator of Keys' campaign he used his position as agent to control all aspects of the campaign. He persuaded Derek Cattell, a former trade union officer and an executive member of Blair's Sedgefield Labour Party to join the campaign. Cattell's resignation from Labour during the election campaign, produced much publicity for the Keys campaign. Clay worked tirelessly for the Keys campaign helping build a coalition of support for Keys. Supporters included the former MP Martin Bell who in his book, The Truth that Sticks (2007) wrote "Of great value was Derek Cattell, formerly on the executive of Sedgefield Labour Party. He defected to Reg's campaign after some heart searching; it cost him some fair weather friends, but the candidate had no loyal supporter from start to finish." (page 103)

Clay went on to live in the Marches city of Hereford, and remains politically active as a volunteer official in the local Labour Party. He has involved himself in a number of local causes, including a group opposed to the building of a by-pass which would disturb ancient archaeological remains known as The Dinedor Serpent. He now lives in the Llansamlet ward of Swansea East, where, on 4 July 2013, he was elected in a by-election, as a Labour Party councillor for the City and County of Swansea Council. His wife, Uta Clay, served as a councillor for the same council, but both stood down at the 2017 election.

References

External links
 

1946 births
Living people
Labour Party (UK) MPs for English constituencies
UK MPs 1983–1987
UK MPs 1987–1992
Alumni of Gonville and Caius College, Cambridge
People educated at Bedford School
Socialist Workers Party (UK) members